Phosphatidylinositol-5-phosphate 4-kinase type-2 beta is an enzyme that in humans is encoded by the PIP4K2B gene.

The protein encoded by this gene catalyzes the phosphorylation of phosphatidylinositol 4-phosphate on the fifth hydroxyl of the myo-inositol ring to form phosphatidylinositol 4,5-bisphosphate. This gene is a member of the phosphatidylinositol-4-phosphate 5-kinase family. The encoded protein sequence does not show similarity to other kinases, but the protein does exhibit kinase activity. Additionally, the encoded protein interacts with p55 TNF receptor.

Interactions
PIP4K2B has been shown to interact with TNFRSF1A. In addition, PIP4K2B has been shown to interact with PIP4K2A and may modulate the cellular localisation of PIP4K2A.

Structure 
The structure of PIP4K2B has been determined through X-ray crystallography.

References

Further reading